Smooth curve hulls are hulls that are rounded and do not usually have any chines or corners. They can be moulded, round-bilged or soft-chined. Examples are the round bilge, semi-round bilge and s-bottom hull.

Characteristics
 The round bilge hull is the most commonly used hull form as the shape promotes planing and has other good properties as well.
 The S-bottom hull allows relative comfort on the boat, as the shape reduces the rolling movement on the boat.

Gallery

Nautical terminology
Naval architecture
fr:Bouchain (bateau)